Todor Lazić (30 August 1930 – 19 July 2000) was a Serbian basketball coach.

References

1930 births
2000 deaths
FC Barcelona Bàsquet coaches
KK Dinamo Pančevo coaches
KK Zastava coaches
ŽKK Dinamo Pančevo coaches
OKK Beograd coaches
Serbian expatriate basketball people in Italy
Serbian expatriate basketball people in Spain
Serbian men's basketball coaches
Sportspeople from Belgrade
Yugoslav basketball coaches